Wenxinia is a genus of bacteria from the family of Rhodobacteraceae. It is named for biologist Chen Wenxin.

References

Rhodobacteraceae
Bacteria genera